Brenton G. "Brent" Yorgason (May 25, 1945 in Mount Pleasant, Utah – October 28, 2016) was an American novelist and writer who used themes about members of the Church of Jesus Christ of Latter-day Saints in the United States.

Many of his works were written in cooperation with his brother, Blaine M. Yorgason.

Bibliography 
List of works. Some of these books were co-authored with Blaine Yorgason, Margaret Yorgason, Wesley Burr, Terry Baker, Kevin Lund, Richard Myers, Frank Herbert, Sonny Detmer, and Donald Mangum.
 From First Date to Chosen Mate/Dating (1977)
 Others (1978)
 Bishop's Horse Race (1979)
 A Town Called Charity (1980)
 From Two to One (1981)
 The Krystal Promise (1981)
 Creating a Celestial Marriage (1982)
 From This Day Forth (1982)
 Marriage and Family Stewardships (1982)
 Seeker of the Gentle Heart (1982)
 Chester, I Love You (1983)
 Miracle (1983)
 Brother Brigham's Gold (1984)
 Ride the Laughing Wind (1984)
 The Loftier Way/Tales From the Book of Mormon (1985)
 Becoming (1986)
 Family Knights/Dirty Socks and Shining Armor (1986)
 Seven Days For Ruby (1986)
 The Eleven Dollar Surgery (1986)
 The Greatest Quest (1987)
 In Search of Steenie Bergman (1988)
 Pardners (1988)
 The Gospel Power Series (1989) - 12 Pamphlet Books
 Sacred Intimacy (1989)
 Beyond the Pearly Gates (1989)
 Here Stands a Man (1990)
 Spiritual Survival in the Last Days (1990)
 Prayers on the Wind/Storm (1991)
 First Christmas Gift (1991)
 The Garrity Test (1992)
 TY: The Ty Detmer Story (1992)
 Standing Tall: The Shawn Bradley Story (1993)
 Simeon's Touch (1993)
 Tarred and Feathered (1994)
 The Carpenter's Son (1994)
 Quiet Miracles (1994)
 On Wings of Love (1995)
 Amazing Grace (1996)
 All I Really Need to Know I Learned in Primary (1997)
 An Angel's Promise (1997)
 Paradise Creek (1998)
 Cherished Intimacy (1998)
 Wing of Words (1998)
 The Carpenter's Son, Part 2 (1999)
 Last Stagecoach Robbery (1999)
 Understanding Death's Passage (2000)
 Grandma's Apple Tree (2000)
 From Darkness Into Light (2000)
 The Story of Ira A Fulton (2001)
 Life Is So Beautiful: The Mary Lou Fulton Story (2002)
 Capturing Your Dreams (2003)
 Little Known Evidences of the Book of Mormon (2003)
 Man of Vision: The Charles Roy Albright Story (2003)
 Seamless Lives: The Frank and Betty Newman Martino Story (2004)
 All About Jim: The James Leo Thynne Story (2004)
 Restoring Righteous Paths: The Story of Kirk and Paula Wilson Story (2005)
 No Greater Joy: The Life and Labors of H. Kay Pugmire (2006)
 One In Thine Hand: The Garth and Eloise Andrus Story (2006)
 Rori: My Miracle, My Angel (2006)

External links

References

1945 births
2016 deaths
20th-century Mormon missionaries
American Mormon missionaries in the United States
20th-century American novelists
21st-century American novelists
American male novelists
Brigham Young University alumni
Brigham Young University faculty
Novelists from Utah
United States Army soldiers
20th-century American male writers
21st-century American male writers